Porrorchis is a genus of worms belonging to the family Plagiorhynchidae.

The species of this genus are found in Malesia and Australia.

Species

Species:

Porrorchis aruensis 
Porrorchis bazae 
Porrorchis brevicanthus

References

Plagiorhynchidae
Acanthocephala genera